Wanita Indonesia ('Indonesian Woman') was a women's organization in Indonesia. It was the women's wing of the Partai Indonesia Raya ('Great Indonesia Party'). Wanita Indonesia was founded on September 11, 1953. The profile of the organization was based on 'nationalism, democracy and humanitarianism'.

Wanita Indonesia ran a programme to establish saving bodies and cooperatives to help women to establish income generating activities. The organization also ran courses in household economy for women.

References

Women's organizations based in Indonesia
Political organizations based in Indonesia
Organizations established in 1953
1953 establishments in Indonesia
Women's wings of political parties in Indonesia
Women's rights in Indonesia